Forbidden Island was the third album by Martin Denny. The album was produced in March 1958 at the Liberty Studios in Hollywood, following the group's nine-month gig performing at Don the Beachcomber's Bora Bora Lounge in Hawaii.  Forbidden Island was Denny's first album to be recorded and released after vibraphonist Arthur Lyman left the group to pursue his own solo career. The album includes four original compositions by Denny: "Cobra", "Exotica", "Primitiva", and "Forbidden Island".

Upon its release in May 1958, Billboard awarded the album four stars and wrote: "Interesting treatment of exotic original and standards . . . produced provocative sound. Good off-beat jockey wax."

Richie Unterberger, in a review for AllMusic.com gave the album four stars and noted that it mixed "island sounds, easy listening, and Asian/world music accents."

Australian critic John Masters wrote in December 1959 that high fidelity addicts may enjoy Denny's "conglomeration of weird and wonderful imitations of tropical rhythms" and opined that, although "most of the content . . . is sugar coated trash, the recorded sound is outstanding and for this reason the disc is commended, as a technical showpiece only, to stereophiles."

Track listing

Side A
1. "Cobra" (Martin Denny) – 3:01 
2. "Port au Prince" (Les Baxter) – 2:07 
3. "Exotica" (Martin Denny) – 3:00 
4. "Little China Doll" (Dave Snell) – 2:38 
5. "Bali Hai" (Richard Rodgers, Oscar Hammerstein) – 2:55
6. "Narcissus Queen" (R. A. Anderson) – 2:25

Side B
1. "Sim Sim" (Les Baxter) – 3:03 
2. "Goony Birds" (Julius Wechter) – 2:13 
3. "Primitiva" (Martin Denny) – 2:30 
4. "March of the Siamese Children" (Richard Rodgers) – 2:43 
5. "Sukura" (Dai Keong Lee) – 2:41 
6. "Forbidden Island" (Martin Denny) – 2:56

Personnel

Band members
 Martin Denny – piano, celeste, arranger, composer
 Augie Colon – Latin instruments, special effects, bird calls, and bongos
 Julius Wechter – vibes, marimba, xylophone, percussion
 Harvey Ragsdale – string bass

Guest specialists
 Lew Paino – percussion 
 Will Brady – flute and musette 
 Bud Lee – guitar and Japanese samisen
 Mike Garcia – conga drum

Other contributors
 Si Waronker – producer
 Garrett-Howard – cover design
 Bob Lang and Ted Keep – engineers
 Sandy Warner – cover model, "the Exotica girl"
 Buck Buchwach – liner notes

Further reading
 Forbidden Island at Ambient Exotica

References

1958 albums
Exotica albums
Martin Denny albums
Liberty Records albums
Albums produced by Martin Denny
Albums arranged by Martin Denny